Vermes is an obsolete taxon for non-arthropod invertebrates.

Vermes may also refer to:

People
Albán Vermes (born 1957), Hungarian swimmer
Géza Vermes (1924-2013), British religious scholar
Krisztián Vermes (born 1985), Hungarian footballer
Peter Vermes (born 1966), American soccer player and coach
Timur Vermes (born 1967), German writer.

Places
Vermeș, commune in Caraș-Severin County, Romania
Vermes, Switzerland, municipality in Delémont
Vermeș, village in Lechința commune, Bistrița-Năsăud County, Romania